Gidney and Cloyd are fictional characters originally appearing in the American animated television program Rocky and His Friends (now known, along with The Bullwinkle Show, as The Rocky and Bullwinkle Show or simply Rocky and Bullwinkle). Their names were adapted from the names "Sidney" and "Floyd", which Jay Ward said were the most boring names ever. (Gidney is also an actual surname indigenous to New England and neighboring areas of Canada. Cloyd is both an actual surname and a given name—see former major league baseball player Cloyd Boyer as well as current major league baseball player Tyler Cloyd.) The names also suggest the Bonnie and Clyde gangster couple, of whom Clyde was the more trigger-happy.

Gidney and Cloyd are "Moon Men", inhabitants of Earth's Moon. They are essentially humanoid, but are depicted as about half the height of the average adult Earth human. Although the narration of the series describes them as "green men", their color varies from scene to scene (including other colors such as orange, tan, and blue). Their skin has black spots, or in some scenes, circles. Their pudgy bodies are pear-shaped. Their onion-shaped heads are bald, save for tufts of hair at the very tops. They have no noses (Cloyd remarks that they have no sense of smell because of this) and they have no visible external ears. Cloyd displays a toothy smile; whatever mouth Gidney may have is concealed by a shaggy mustache. Cloyd wears a belt and holster for his scrootch gun (which has the power to immobilize its targets for a variable length of time). They are otherwise unclothed. Both Gidney and Cloyd possess the ability to disappear and reappear at will; they can disappear completely, but at times their eyes, and/or Cloyd's mouth, may remain visible (in the manner of the Cheshire cat's smile), though any equipment they carry, such as Cloyd's scrootch gun, remain visible even when they vanish fully.

The Moon Men appeared in Jet Fuel Formula, the first Rocky and Bullwinkle story arc, broadcast 1959-1960. In this story they come to Earth in an attempt to thwart a rush of tourists to the Moon, only to become media celebrities themselves. They initially succumb to the temptations of fame but soon tire of it. (In Cloyd's words, "It's all so wonderful we can't STAND it anymore!") With the help of Rocky and Bullwinkle, they are eventually able to get home. Gidney and Cloyd return in the second-season story arc Metal-Munching Mice and in the third-season story arc Missouri Mish Mash.

Cloyd was voiced by legendary voice actor Paul Frees in the original series and is voiced by Rachel Butera in the 2018 series. Gidney was voiced by Bill Scott; although Scott was credited as a producer and writer for the series, he was uncredited for his voice work, which included Bullwinkle, Fearless Leader and Dudley Do-Right as well as Gidney. In the 2018 series, Gidney is voiced by Ben Diskin.

In the 2018 reboot The Adventures of Rocky and Bullwinkle, Gidney and Cloyd are related in this version as father and son. Cloyd is also a child in the reboot. Unlike the original series, they don't speak English.

Home video
Jet Fuel Formula was released on DVD on August 5, 2003, as part of Rocky & Bullwinkle & Friends Complete Season 1. This 4-disc set includes both Jet Fuel Formula and Box Top Robbery (the other season 1 story arc) in their entirety, along with all supporting features from the first season (1959–1960).

Metal-Munching Mice was released as part of Rocky & Bullwinkle & Friends Complete Season 2 on August 31, 2004.

Missouri Mish Mash was released as part of Rocky & Bullwinkle & Friends Complete Season 3 in 2005.

References

External links

Animated duos
Extraterrestrial characters in television
Fictional humanoids
Rocky and Bullwinkle characters
Moon in culture